Kimani is a surname of Kenyan origin that may refer to:

Samwel Mushai Kimani, Kenyan visually impaired runner
Harry Kimani (born 1982), Kenyan musician
Humphrey Kimani Njuguna (born 1961), Kenyan politician
Joseph Kimani (1972–2012), Kenyan long-distance runner
Lucia Kimani (born 1981), Kenyan-Bosnian marathon runner
Martin Kimani (born 1971), Kenyan ambassador to the United Nations 
Victoria Kimani (born 1984), Kenyan-American singer
Wendy Kimani (born 1986), Kenyan singer

Kimani as a given name
Kimani Ffriend (born 1977), Jamaican basketball player
Kimani Herring (born 1975), American football player
Kimani Jones (born 1981), American football player
Kimani Maruge (1920–2009), Guinness World Record holder
Kimani Press, publisher

Kenyan names